Cadsden is a hamlet in South Buckinghamshire, England, two miles north east of Princes Risborough. At the time of the 2011 Census, the population of the hamlet was included in the civil parish of Lacey Green.

History 
The origin of the name, which also appears as Cadsden, is doubtful and it is not known when it was first used. If it dates back to Anglo-Saxon times, when most of the other local place names first appeared, it probably meant 'valley frequented by wild cats'.

It is said that in 1643 a wake was held in Cadsden for John Hampden by his beloved Greencoats, whilst escorting his body back to the family home at Great Hampden from Thame, where he died following the Battle of Chalgrove Field.

On 30 January 1943 a Royal Air Force (RAF) Avro Anson Mk1 serial no. L7964 was on a Night Navigation Training exercise from the Central School of Navigation, flying from RAF Cranage, Cheshire. The weather conditions were poor and at 0250 hours the Anson crashed at Longdown Farm in Cadsden, killing all four crew members. The accident was witnessed by an instructor in a second aircraft. The names and positions of the deceased were: Sgt Edward A. Merry, Pilot; Sgt James R. Craven, Pilot; Sgt Kenneth R. Blaskey, Pilot; and Sgt Albert C. Poulton, Wireless Operator and Air Gunner.

Transport 

The railway service in the area was improved in 2011 with the Chiltern Mainline project. The two nearest mainline railway stations are Princes Risborough (2 miles, 33–40 mins to Marylebone) and Great Missenden (9 miles, 40 mins to Marylebone), with a branchline station at Monks Risborough (1 mile, 52 mins to Marylebone).

Local amenities and traditions 

Every year on the first Sunday in August there is a Cherry Pie Festival, which has been a tradition in Cadsden for over 100 years.

Grangelands and Pulpit Hill, which stretch from Cadsden to Kimble, are a Site of Special Scientific Interest (SSSI) with an array of wildlife including glow worms  and the bee orchid. Up on Pulpit Hill, set within Pulpit Woods, are the remains of an Iron Age hill fort, a scheduled ancient monument.

In 2009, Bucks County Council in partnership with Plantlife International started a juniper conservation programme on Pulpit Hill where pens have been created to support juniper growth.

Whiteleaf Golf Course, which occupies the land between Whiteleaf and Cadsden, is a 9-hole course established in 1907. During the winter months when it snows, the Cadsden end of the course is used for tobogganing.

Local issues are addressed and events organised by the Whiteleaf and Cadsden Resident's Association.

Sarah Harding from Girls Aloud was a resident of Cadsden between 2008 and 2017.

Relationship with Prime Ministers 

Chequers, the Prime Minister's country residence, is the first property encountered along The Ridgeway path north east from Cadsden. This walk was featured in an article published by The Sunday Times in June 2010.

The Plough at Cadsden is a country pub which is used by Prime Ministers due to its proximity to Chequers. There is a picture of Edward Heath at the bar, which can be seen on The Plough's website.

In November 2015, Cameron visited The Plough with Chinese President Xi Jinping for a pint of real ale and fish and chips.

Millionaires Row 

Cadsden is colloquially known as "Millionaires Row" as the average house price on Cadsden Road is over £1 million.

TV location 
Cadsden was featured in the Midsomer Murders episode "Down Among the Dead Men" where it was called Cadsden Ridge for TV purposes.

Cadsden Road was used in an episode of Hammer House of Horror, where Warren Clarke crashed his car there.

External links 
 Chilterns Area of Outstanding Natural Beauty
 Plough at Cadsden website
 Plantlife International

References 

Hamlets in Buckinghamshire